Alberto Galuppo (born 19 August 1985) is an Italian footballer who plays for Italian Serie D club Lentigione as a defender.

Career

Parma
Born in Reggio Emilia, Galuppo started his professional career at Emilian club Parma F.C. Since 2005–06 season he was loaned to various Serie C1 club. He only played once for Ancona before his loan was terminated. In January 2008 Galuppo left for Serie C2 club Carpenedolo. Galuppo returned to the Italian third division for Venezia in 2008–09 Lega Pro Prima Divisione. In January 2009 he made his Serie B debut for league struggler Treviso. Galuppo spent 2009–10 Lega Pro Prima Divisione for Cremonese.

Cesena–Parma swap (2010)
In June 2010, few days before the closure of 2009–10 financial year, he was exchanged with Milan Đurić in co-ownership deal. Both players' 50% registration rights were valued €1.1 million, thus both clubs got a paper profit as it intangible asset increased (the new value of the player contract, as youth product did not have any historic cost value to form that asset). However, Cesena never able to benefit from the player in the football field as Galuppo was loaned out with disappointing performance (3 games a season), instead, benefited financially. 

Galuppo left for Atletico Roma on 31 August 2010, re-joining other Parma teammate in temporary deal in 2010–11 season.

Parma return (2011)
After Marco Rossi joined Cesena in June 2011 in co-ownership deal for €2 million, Galuppo returned to Parma in July for €1 million. Galuppo was loaned out again for Foligno.

Siena–Parma swap (2012)
In June 2012, Parma made swap deals with other clubs again, which saw Manuel Coppola (€1.6 million), Galuppo (€1.7M), Abdou Doumbia (€0.5M) and Dellafiore (€1.8M) moved to Siena; Andrea Rossi (€1.8M), Alessandro Iacobucci (€1.7M), Gonçalo Brandão (€1.6M) and Giuseppe Pacini (€0.5M) to Parma. The move meant Parma did not have any cost generated from Galuppo in the 2011–12 financial year as the amortization of his transfer fee was totally outweighed by the profit. However it created another transfer fee to be amortized in 2012–13 accounts and beyond.

Both clubs did not announce the deal in their website and Galuppo, along with Doumbia and Parma teammate Diego Mella, left for San Marino Calcio in another temporary deal.

Galuppo made his debut as starting centre-back on 5 August 2012, a 2012–13 Coppa Italia match.

On 27 July 2013 he was loaned to Savona.

He suffered a knee injury in October 2013.

Parma return (2014)
Galuppo returned to Parma again on 18 June 2014, with Gonçalo Brandão moved back to Siena. Both 50% registration rights of the players were tagged for €1.1 million. In August 2014 he was signed by Gubbio in another temporary deal.

Serie D career
In summer 2015 Galuppo was signed by Serie D club Lentigione.

Footnotes

References

External links
 
 FIGC  
 AIC profile (data by football.it)  

Italian footballers
Serie B players
Parma Calcio 1913 players
Pisa S.C. players
F.C. Pavia players
A.C. Ancona players
Venezia F.C. players
Treviso F.B.C. 1993 players
U.S. Cremonese players
A.C. Cesena players
Atletico Roma F.C. players
A.S.D. Città di Foligno 1928 players
Association football defenders
Sportspeople from Reggio Emilia
1985 births
Living people
Footballers from Emilia-Romagna